Farim is a town in northern Guinea-Bissau.

Farim may also refer to:
 Farim, name for the upper course of the Cacheu River, in Guinea-Bissau
 Farim, Iran, a city in northern Iran
 Farim Rural District, Iran
 Farim (crater), a crater on Mars
 SC Farim - a football club based in the town of Farim, Guinea-Bissau